Barrow Hill railway station is a former railway station in the village of Barrow Hill in northern Derbyshire, England.

History
The station was originally opened as "Staveley" in 1841, a year after the opening of the North Midland Railway. It was designed to serve the village of Staveley and the substantial ironworks near the station.

Allen's guide of 1842 writes of "Staveley upon the hill to the left ; Mr. Barrow's iron-works in the valley."

The station on what became known as the "Old Road" between Chesterfield and Rotherham Masborough. It was in an area undergoing rapid industrialisation. Iron working had been carried on for many centuries and Staveley works itself had been opened in 1702. The land originally had been owned by the Duke of Devonshire but the copyhold had been bought by Richard Barrow in 1840.
 
Whites Gazetteer, in 1857, records "Staveley Works, 1 mile E. from Staveley, is an ancient iron smelting establishment; there are documents in existence proving it to have been a place of considerable importance centuries ago, but its early history will not bear any comparison with the vastness of operations in the present day. Here are the collieries and extensive ironworks of Richard Barrow, Esq., with blast furnaces, producing 200 tons of metal weekly. Castings and foundry work of all kinds are executed at this extensive establishment. Neat residences for the clerks and overlookers have been built in the vicinity, besides a great number of cottages."

Local ore had been worked out by 1870, but the works continued to expand, bringing increasing work for the railway. The station was moved and rebuilt in 1888 in a new position when the Clowne Branch was opened.

There were three platforms, two on the main line and one for the branch, with typical Midland buildings, some in brick others of timber.

In 1870, a large locomotive shed was opened, known as Staveley (Barrow Hill) Depot, coded 18D by the LMS and renumbered 41E in 1958. It included a 24 "road" (track) roundhouse. It closed in 1991, but has been preserved and reopened in 1998 as Barrow Hill Roundhouse & Railway Centre.

In 1900, the station was renamed "Barrow Hill and Staveley Works". It was renamed again by British Railways in 1951, becoming plain Barrow Hill.

The station closed to regular passenger traffic in 1954 but remained in place for many years. On 26 September 1971, it was used for a shuttle service from Chesterfield in connection with an open day at Barrow Hill engine shed. It remained in use for special services until at least 1981.

Modern traffic
At 22 June 2013 the line is part of the Midland Main Line.

Passenger services

In 1922 passenger services calling at Barrow Hill were at their most intensive, with trains serving four destinations via five overlapping routes:

 On Sundays only 
 On Mondays to Saturdays three stopping services plied between Sheffield (MR) and Chesterfield
 most ran direct down the "New Road" through  and went nowhere near Barrow Hill.
 the other two services went the "long way round" via the "Old Road". They set off north eastwards from Sheffield (MR) towards Rotherham then swung east to go south along the Old Road
 one of these continued north past , a short distance before Masboro' then swung hard right, next stop , then all stations, including Barrow Hill, to Chesterfield, 
Also on Mondays to Saturdays two stopping services plied between Mansfield (MR) and Chesterfield via Barrow Hill
some ran via the circuitous Clowne Branch through Elmton and Creswell, Clown (MR) and 

Possible future

The lines from Barrow Hill and Foxlow Junction to Hall Lane Junction and thence to Seymour Junction and on to the former Markham Colliery have been mothballed as they run to the new Markham Vale Enterprise Zone at M1 Junction 29A. 

The trackbed of the Clowne Branch from Seymour Junction has been protected too. Furthermore, the trackbed of the Oxcroft Branch off the Clowne Branch east of Seymour Junction has been protected as there remains the possibility of opencasting in the area. For example, in 2005 UK Coal (now Coalfield Resources), expressed an interest in extracting c530,000 tons near Mastin Moor.

See also
Four other stations have at some time included "Staveley" in their names:

  on the Great Central Main Line about two miles east of Barrow Hill
  on the Midland Railway Clowne Branch about 250 yds east of Staveley Central
  on the "Chesterfield Loop" off the Great Central Main Line about half a mile south of Barrow Hill, and
  on the Windermere Branch Line in Cumbria

References

Notes

Sources

External links

Disused railway stations in Derbyshire
Railway stations in Great Britain opened in 1841
Railway stations in Great Britain closed in 1954
Former Midland Railway stations